Pirates of the Sea is a musical project that in May 2008 represented Latvia in Eurovision Song Contest in Belgrade, Serbia with their song "Wolves of the Sea". It consists of three members: Italian singer Roberto Meloni who is living in Latvia, dancer Aleksandra Kurusova as well as the TV and radio person Jānis Vaišļa. Meloni also represented Latvia in the Eurovision Song Contest 2007 as a part of Bonaparti.lv.

The song "Wolves of the Sea" was written by four Swedish composers: Jonas Liberg, Johan Sahlen, Claes Andreasson and Torbjörn Wassenius. On February 2, Pirates won the first semi-final of the national finals, getting 12 010 televotes - the best result of both semi-finals. However, the jury put them in ninth place from 10 songs of the first semi-final. On March 1, Pirates of the Sea also won the national final, which took place in Ventspils. They got 29 228 votes and beat their closest opponents Aisha and Andris Ērglis. On May 22 Pirates of the Sea participated in the second semi-final of Eurovision Song Contest 2008 and went on to become a finalist. Pirates of the Sea got the most points from Ireland (12) and United Kingdom (10) and were placed 12th in the final result of the competition.

On October 30, 2008, the pirate-themed power metal band Alestorm released a cover version of "Wolves of the Sea" on their EP Leviathan, and their 2009 album Black Sails at Midnight. Pirates of the Sea also had a song called "Happy Balalaika", released on a dance complication CD in Europe in 2008.

Jānis Vaišļa died on 9 January 2016 aged 46 from cardiac amyloidosis, after struggling with heart problems. He and fellow band member Aleksandra Kurusova had competed on the first season of The Amazing Race: China Rush, where they finished in 8th position.

See also
Latvia in the Eurovision Song Contest 2008

References

Latvian pop music groups
Eurovision Song Contest entrants for Latvia
Eurovision Song Contest entrants of 2008
Piracy in fiction